Robert Christian Anderson (July 22, 1890 – June 25, 1963) was an American actor of Danish birth who appeared in silent films.

Biography
Anderson was born in Odense, Denmark. He was also a make-up artist and director (of one short). Anderson and D.W. Griffith were the principal makeup artists on Griffith's monumental classic Intolerance. He later appeared in Griffith's World War I propaganda film Hearts of the World (1918). In addition to Hearts of the World Anderson can be seen today in surviving silent films such as The Heart of Humanity (1918) another World War I film where he played one of the Patricia brothers. He makes a noteworthy appearance alongside Lionel Barrymore in The Temptress (1926), Greta Garbo's second MGM film.

Anderson's is known for his silent film performance as the villain Sebastian in MGM's White Shadows in the South Seas (1928), lushly filmed in Tahiti and  the second film to win an Academy Award for cinematography. The film was directed by W.S. "Woody" Van Dyke and starred Monte Blue as the hero.

Anderson continued in films a few more years after sound arrived, his last film credit being in 1934. He died in 1963.

Selected filmography

References

External links
Robert Anderson at IMDb.com

1890 births
1963 deaths
People from Odense
American male silent film actors
Danish male silent film actors
20th-century Danish male actors
Danish emigrants to the United States
20th-century American male actors